The 2012 Carolina Challenge Cup was the ninth staging of the Carolina Challenge Cup, a preseason soccer tournament hosted by USL Pro side, Charleston Battery. Held from February 25–March 3, the Cup featured three Major League Soccer clubs and one USL PRO club.

D.C. United of MLS, the two-time defending champions, successfully defended their title for the third consecutive year, after the tournament was cut short due to inclement weather.

Teams
Four clubs competed in the tournament:

Standings

Matches

Scorers
2 goals
Jose Cuevas (Charleston Battery)
Hamdi Salihi (D.C. United)
1 goal
Eddie Gaven (Columbus Crew)
Milovan Mirošević (Columbus Crew)
Federico Puppo (Chicago Fire)
Ryan Richter (D.C. United)
Maicon Santos (D.C. United)
Marcelo Saragosa (D.C. United)

See also
 Carolina Challenge Cup
 Charleston Battery
 2012 in American soccer

References

External links
 Carolina Challenge Cup release and schedule 

2012
Carolina Challenge Cup
2012 in sports in South Carolina
February 2012 sports events in the United States
March 2012 sports events in the United States